Rodrigo Hernán Petryk Vidal (born 21 October 1994) is a Uruguayan professional footballer who plays as a defender for Wanderers, on loan from Peñarol.

Career
Petryk's career began in 2013 with Atenas, with the defender featuring for the Uruguayan Segunda División club in the 2013–14 campaign. His professional debut arrived on 12 October 2013 during a draw away to Canadian. Atenas finished 2013–14 second which secured promotion to the 2014–15 Uruguayan Primera División, a season in which Petryk subsequently made eleven appearances in. January 2016 saw Petryk join fellow top-flight team Peñarol. He scored his first senior goal for the club on 27 May 2017 during a 3–0 home victory against Fénix, in a season that ended with the league title.

Argentine Primera División side Chacarita Juniors loaned Petryk in January 2018. One goal, versus Vélez Sarsfield, in twelve appearances followed. After Chacarita Juniors were relegated at the conclusion of 2017–18, Petryk returned to Peñarol prior to departing on loan to Argentina once again on 3 August 2018; signing for newly promoted San Martín of the Argentine Primera División. He was selected by interim manager Ariel Martos for the first time on 23 September against Argentinos Juniors.

Career statistics
.

Honours
Peñarol
Uruguayan Primera División: 2017

References

External links

1994 births
Living people
Uruguayan people of Polish descent
People from Punta del Este
Uruguayan footballers
Association football defenders
Uruguayan expatriate footballers
Expatriate footballers in Argentina
Uruguayan expatriate sportspeople in Argentina
Uruguayan Segunda División players
Uruguayan Primera División players
Argentine Primera División players
Atenas de San Carlos players
Peñarol players
Chacarita Juniors footballers
Montevideo Wanderers F.C. players
San Martín de Tucumán footballers